James George Minter, was a British film producer and screenwriter born in Islington, London. He established the company Renown Pictures.

Few pictures seem to remain of Minter - though he is pictured at a wedding at https://theminters.co.uk/showmedia.php?mediaID=1239&medialinkID=697

Life and career 
James George Minter was born in England on 7 May 1911 in the inner London suburb of Islington. LIttle is now known about his early life but in 1939 he married Cecile Visco who was a clothing designer. The couple moved to the (then) more upmarket London district of Kensington. Minter had trained and qualified as an accountant - a skill which undoubtedly helped him progress in his career - during the years of World War Two (1939-1945) he worked in different capacities (very often uncredited) on the production of more and more movies. However, the 1940s movies with which he was concerned were only a prelude to his best loved work in the 1950s. By the late 1940s he had started his own distribution and production company called "Renown Pictures" and in 1951 Renown released "Scrooge" a highly cinematic retelling of Charles Dickens' short story "A Christmas Carol". The film starred Alastair Sim and many other stalwarts of the British stage and screen community and is proudly "Presented by George Minter".

In 1952 Minter was a producer on another adaptation of Charles Dickens' work. This time, the project was to boil down the appealing but rambling novel "The Pickwick Papers" - which had originally appeared in print as a serial in a magazine over 100 years previously. Curiously, although silent movie versions of that story had been brought to cinema screen before, Minter's was the first and (to date in 2023) the only live-action sound version released as a film.  Director and screen writer Noel Langley in collaboration with Minter made the inspired casting choice of choosing British character actor James Hayter (actor) as Mr Samuel Pickwick and assembing an excellent supporting cast. This makes the film one of Minter's most enduring achievements and along with "Scrooge" it remains - anecdotally - a Christmas seasonal favourite in many British households.

Minter went on to produce numerous other films through the 1950s and 1960s - ranging from classical adaptations to comedies in the "Carry on..." series.

He died 8 July 1966.

Select credits
 No Orchids for Miss Blandish (1948)
 Old Mother Riley's Jungle Treasure (1950), 
 A Christmas Carol (1951) (Producer)
 Dance, Little Lady (1954)
 The Pickwick Papers (1952) (Producer)
Tread Softly Stranger (1958)

References

External links

1911 births
1966 deaths
Film producers from London
English male screenwriters
20th-century English screenwriters
20th-century English male writers